Benjamin Jacques Marcel Pavard (born 28 March 1996) is a French professional footballer who plays as a right-back for  club Bayern Munich and the France national team. Considered one of the best defenders in the world, Pavard is known for his tackling prowess and excellent positioning.  Although usually deployed as a right-back, he is also capable of playing as a centre-back.

He began his career at Lille in Ligue 1 and transferred to VfB Stuttgart in 2016, where he won the 2. Bundesliga in his first season. In January 2019 he agreed a move to Bayern Munich, which was completed after Stuttgart's relegation at the end of the season. In 2020, he completed an historic sextuple by winning the Bundesliga, DFB-Pokal, Champions League, DFL-Supercup, UEFA Super Cup and FIFA Club World Cup.

Pavard made his international debut for France in November 2017, and won the 2018 FIFA World Cup and the 2020–21 UEFA Nations League, also featuring at UEFA Euro 2020 and the 2022 World Cup.

Early life
Benjamin Jacques Marcel Pavard was born on 28 March 1996 in Maubeuge, Nord.

Club career

Early career
Pavard first played with his hometown club in Jeumont, where former France international striker Jean-Pierre Papin also began his career.

Spotted by Jean-Michel Vandamme, Pavard joined Lille's academy at the age of nine. He made his Ligue 1 debut on 31 January 2015 against FC Nantes, playing the full game in a 1–1 away draw. Pavard made 21 league appearances across two seasons for Lille, before leaving the club in 2016.

VfB Stuttgart

On 30 August 2016, Pavard moved to VfB Stuttgart, signing a four-year contract. He made his debut in the 2. Bundesliga on 3 October, scoring in a 4–0 home win over SpVgg Greuther Fürth. He played 21 games and his team ended the season as league champions.

Pavard made his Bundesliga debut on 19 August in a 2–0 loss at Hertha BSC. He scored his first goal in the Bundesliga with a delightful back header on 29 October in a 3–0 win over SC Freiburg at the Mercedes-Benz Arena. He extended his contract with Stuttgart on 20 December 2017 until 30 June 2021.

He was one of only four players to feature in every single second of the 2017–18 Bundesliga season. He played in several positions, namely right-back, centre-back, defensive midfielder and right wing, but after the appointment of Tayfun Korkut as manager in January 2018 he was exclusively a centre back; the team conceded 10 goals in their last 14 games as they went from near the relegation places to finish 7th, only just missing out on a UEFA Europa League place.

In 2018–19, Pavard was again a regular as Stuttgart fought relegation all season, which was confirmed with defeat to 1. FC Union Berlin in a playoff.

Bayern Munich
On 9 January 2019, Bayern Munich confirmed Pavard would join the club for the 2019–20 season, signing a five-year contract lasting until 30 June 2024.

He made his competitive debut on 3 August in a 2–0 defeat in the 2019 DFL-Supercup against Borussia Dortmund, as an 80th-minute substitute for Thiago Alcântara. On 31 August, he scored his first goal for the club to equalise in a 6–1 home win over Mainz 05. On 11 February 2021, Pavard scored Bayern's only goal in a 1–0 win against Tigres UANL in the 2020 FIFA Club World Cup Final, as the club won its sixth trophy in a year.

On 26 October 2022, he scored his first Champions League goal in a 3–0 away win against Barcelona. A week later, he scored a goal in a 2–0 victory against Inter Milan, in which Bayern Munich finished top of their Group C with six wins out of six matches for the second consecutive season. On 11 March 2023, he scored a first-half brace in a 5–3 home win over FC Augsburg.

International career
On 6 November 2017, Pavard was selected by France's head coach Didier Deschamps for the friendly matches against Wales and Germany. He made his debut against the Welsh on 10 November in a 2–0 win at the Stade de France, replacing Christophe Jallet at half time.

On 17 May 2018, he was called up to the 23-man French squad for the 2018 FIFA World Cup in Russia. On 16 June, Pavard made his World Cup debut in a 2–1 victory over Australia. On 30 June, Pavard scored his first international goal, a half-volley from outside the penalty area, in a 4–3 victory over Argentina in the World Cup's round of 16. The goal was later voted as goal of the tournament and nominated for the Puskas Award of the year. He also became the first French defender to score a goal in the World Cup since Lilian Thuram scored against Croatia in the 1998 semi-final. Pavard won the World Cup, after starting all of France's games except for their last group match against Denmark.

At UEFA Euro 2020, Pavard suffered a head injury in France's opening 1–0 win over Germany, but continued playing. He said after the game that he felt "a little knocked out for 10 to 15 seconds". This appeared to break UEFA's protocol that a player showing signs of concussion should be withdrawn from the match, whether or not he or the manager agreed with it. After analysing reports by the French team's doctors, UEFA concluded that Pavard never lost consciousness and it was right for him to play on.

On 9 November 2022, he was called up to the 25-man French squad for the 2022 FIFA World Cup in Qatar.

Career statistics

Club

International

France score listed first, score column indicates score after each Pavard goal

Honours
VfB Stuttgart
2. Bundesliga: 2016–17

Bayern Munich
Bundesliga: 2019–20, 2020–21, 2021–22
DFB-Pokal: 2019–20
DFL-Supercup: 2020, 2021, 2022
UEFA Champions League: 2019–20
UEFA Super Cup: 2020
FIFA Club World Cup: 2020

France
FIFA World Cup: 2018; runner-up: 2022
UEFA Nations League: 2020–21

Individual
FIFA World Cup Goal of the Tournament: 2018
UEFA Champions League Breakthrough XI: 2019
kicker Bundesliga Team of the Season: 2019–20

Orders
Knight of the Legion of Honour: 2018

References

External links

Profile at the FC Bayern Munich website

1996 births
Living people
People from Maubeuge
Sportspeople from Nord (French department)
Footballers from Hauts-de-France
French footballers
Association football defenders
Lille OSC players
VfB Stuttgart players
FC Bayern Munich footballers
Championnat National 2 players
Ligue 1 players
Championnat National 3 players
2. Bundesliga players
Bundesliga players
UEFA Champions League winning players
France youth international footballers
France under-21 international footballers
France international footballers
2018 FIFA World Cup players
UEFA Euro 2020 players
2022 FIFA World Cup players
FIFA World Cup-winning players
UEFA Nations League-winning players
French expatriate footballers
Expatriate footballers in Germany
French expatriate sportspeople in Germany
Chevaliers of the Légion d'honneur